Winters Lane Historic District is a national historic district at Catonsville, Baltimore County, Maryland, United States. It is a historically African-American residential community which developed between 1867 and the mid-1940s.  Winters Lane is located between Frederick Road and the Baltimore National Pike.  It is composed mainly of single-family dwellings augmented by a few commercial, social, or religious resources. The district contains 155 properties, including 141 residential properties, two former schools, three commercial buildings, three social clubs, and five churches or church-related buildings.

It was added to the National Register of Historic Places in 2007.

References

External links
 at Maryland Historical Trust
Boundary Map of the Winters Lane Historic District, Baltimore County, at Maryland Historical Trust

Catonsville, Maryland
Historic districts in Baltimore County, Maryland
Gothic Revival architecture in Maryland
Queen Anne architecture in Maryland
Historic districts on the National Register of Historic Places in Maryland
African-American history of Baltimore County, Maryland
National Register of Historic Places in Baltimore County, Maryland